Paphiopedilum javanicum, commonly known as the Java paphiopedilum, is a species of orchid from southeast Asia, specifically in Java, Bali, Flores and Sumatra. Its population is decreasing due to a number of threats, causing the IUCN to list it as an endangered species.

References

javanicum
Plants described in 1888